Gauche is an R7RS Scheme implementation.  It is designed for scripting in a production environment.  It is intended to allow programmers and system administrators to write scripts in support of daily operations. Quick startup, built-in system interface, native multilingual support are some of its key design goals.

Gauche is free software under the BSD License.  It is primarily developed by Shiro Kawai.

Features
Quick startup - Gauche includes common features in its executable, while less common functions are in libraries which are loaded on demand.
Module system - A simple module system, API compatible to STklos.
Object system - CLOS-like object system with metaobject protocol. Almost API compatible to STklos. It is also similar to Guile's object system.
Native multilingual support - Strings are represented by multibyte string internally. You can use UTF-8, EUC-JP, Shift-JIS or no multibyte encoding.  Conversion between native coding system and external coding system is supported by port objects.
Multibyte regexp - Regular expression matcher is aware of multibyte string; you can use multibyte characters both in patterns and matched strings.
Built-in system interface - Gauche has built-in support for most POSIX.1 system calls.
Network interface - Has API for socket-based network interface, including IPv6 if the OS supports it.
Multithreading - Multithreading is supported on top of pthreads. Scheme-level API conforms to SRFI-18.
DBM interface - Interfaces to dbm, ndbm and/or gdbm.
XML parsing - Oleg Kiselyov's SXML tools are included.

References

Notes
R. Kelsey, W. Clinger, J. Rees (eds.), Revised^5 Report on the Algorithmic Language Scheme, Higher-Order and Symbolic Computation, 11(1), September, 1998 and ACM SIGPLAN Notices, 33(9), October, 1998. 
Carl Bruggeman, Oscar Waddell and R. Kent Dybvig, Representing control in the presence of one-shot continuations, in Proceedings of SIGPLAN '96, pp. 99-107, 1996.
Eugene Myers, An O(ND) Difference Algorithm and Its Variations, Algorithmica Vol. 1 No. 2, pp. 251-266, 1986.
Gregor Kiczales, Jim Des Rivieres, Daniel Bobrow, The Art of Metaobject Protocol, The MIT Press. 
Kim Barrett, Bob Cassels, Paul Haahr, David A. Moon, Keith Playford, P. Tucker Withington, A Monotonic Superclass Linearization for Dylan, in Proceedings of OOPSLA 96, October 1996.

External links
Gauche home page
Gauche reference manual
Gauche development progress & plan
Standards conformance and platform list
Shooting A Moving Target - An Experience in Developing a Production Tracking Database
Tracking Assets in the Production of 'Final Fantasy: The Spirits Within'
Gluing Things Together - Scheme in a Real-time CG Content Production

Scheme (programming language) interpreters
Scheme (programming language) implementations
Free compilers and interpreters
Cross-platform software
Software using the BSD license